|}

The Glencairn Stakes is a Listed flat horse race in Ireland open to thoroughbreds aged three years or older. It is run at Leopardstown over a distance of 1 mile (1,609 metres), and it is scheduled to take place each year in June. Prior to 2001 it was run over 1 mile and 1 furlong.

Winners

See also
 Horse racing in Ireland
 List of Irish flat horse races

References
Racing Post:

Flat races in Ireland
Open mile category horse races
Leopardstown Racecourse